KMXJ-FM (94.1 FM, "Mix 94.1") is a commercial radio station located in Amarillo, Texas.  KMXJ-FM airs an adult contemporary music format branded as "Mix 94.1".

KMXJ is owned by Townsquare Media.  Its studios are located on Southwest 34th Avenue in Southwest Amarillo, and its transmitter tower is based north of the city in unincorporated Potter County.

External links
KMXJ-FM official website

MXJ-FM
Hot adult contemporary radio stations in the United States
Radio stations established in 1978
1978 establishments in Texas
Townsquare Media radio stations